The 2020 Big Ten softball season began with practices in January 2020, followed by the start of the 2020 NCAA Division I softball season in February. Conference will start in March 2020 and will conclude in May, followed by the 2020 Big Ten Conference softball tournament at Eichelberger Field in Champaign, Illinois, in May.

Coronavirus impact and cancellation
As of March 12, 2020, the NCAA cancelled both the remainder of the season and the tournament due to the coronavirus pandemic.

Head coaches

Coaching changes prior to the season

Maryland
On August 7, 2019, Maryland head coach Julie Wright stepped down as head coach. On September 9, 2019, the school hired former Louisiana Tech head coach Mark Montgomery as the next head coach.

Coaches
Note: Stats shown are before the beginning of the season. Overall and Big Ten records are from time at current school.

Conference matrix

References

 
Big Ten Conference softball seasons